The Sagamore of the Wabash is an honorary award in the state of Indiana. It is given by the Governor of Indiana under their own criteria, and there is no official record kept of all previous recipients.

The award was first created by Governor Ralph F. Gates to compete with the Kentucky Colonel title, with the first two Sagamores being Robert A. Taft and Simeon Willis. The title was later given to those who had contributed to Indiana life: several recipients have been associated with Indiana University (IU), with former president Herman B Wells receiving the award six times. Other recipients have included astronauts (Gus Grissom), athletes (Michael Brinegar, Ray LeBlanc), comedians (David Letterman), musicians (Willie Nelson), and presidents (George H. W. Bush).

At least one fictional character has been the recipient of an award, being Garfield (creator Jim Davis received an award four years prior).

Recipients

Awarded under Ralph F. Gates

Awarded under Henry F. Schricker

Awarded under George N. Craig

Awarded under Harold W. Handley

Awarded under Matthew E. Welsh

Awarded under Roger D. Branigin

Awarded under Edgar Whitcomb

Awarded under Otis Bowen

Awarded under Robert D. Orr

Awarded under Evan Bayh

Awarded under Frank O'Bannon

Awarded under Joe Kernan

Awarded under Mitch Daniels

Awarded under Mike Pence

Awarded under Eric Holcomb

References

Sagamore
Indiana culture